Todd Charles Morton (born December 5, 1995) is an American soccer player who plays as a goalkeeper.

Career

College & Amateur
Morton began playing college soccer at the University of Maryland, Baltimore County in 2015, but transferred to the University of Delaware in 2016, where he played for four years.

While at college, Morton also appeared for a variety of USL Premier Development League sides; Reading United AC in 2015, Lehigh Valley United in 2016, and Ocean City Nor'easters from 2017 to 2018.

Professional
On February 11, 2019, Morton joined USL Championship side Real Monarchs. Morton transferred to USL side Bethlehem Steel on August 1, 2019 for an undisclosed fee. He made his debut the same day, starting in a 3–0 loss to Hartford Athletic.

Personal
Todd's brother is fellow professional soccer goalkeeper, Kyle Morton, who currently plays for the Houston Dynamo in MLS.

References

External links
Profile at UMBC
Profile at Delaware
Profile at Real Salt Lake
Profile at USL

1995 births
Living people
American soccer players
Association football goalkeepers
UMBC Retrievers men's soccer players
Delaware Fightin' Blue Hens men's soccer players
Reading United A.C. players
Lehigh Valley United players
Ocean City Nor'easters players
Real Monarchs players
Philadelphia Union II players
People from West Chester, Pennsylvania
Soccer players from Pennsylvania
Sportspeople from Chester County, Pennsylvania
USL League Two players
USL Championship players